Río Chico Department is a department in Santa Cruz Province, Argentina. It has a population of 2,926 (2001) and an area of 34,262 km². The seat of the department is in Gobernador Gregores.

Municipalities and communes
Bajo Caracoles
Gobernador Gregores
Hipólito Yrigoyen
Río Olnie

Demography
According to a June 2008 estimate from INDEC the population of the department is 3,107.

Table with the demographic evolution of the Río Chico Department according to the national censuses and the variation between censuses in percentage:

Source: Instituto Nacional de Estadísticas y Censos, INDEC

References

Notes
This article includes content from the Spanish Wikipedia article Departamento Río Chico (Santa Cruz).

Departments of Santa Cruz Province, Argentina